Jacob Gerritsz Loef (1605/1607 – 1683/1685), was a Dutch Golden Age marine painter.

He was born and died in Enkhuizen and worked there and in nearby Hoorn. According to the RKD he is known for his marines and Gerrit Pompe was his pupil. He signed his works with the monogram IGL.

References

Jacob Gerritsz. Loef on Artnet

1600s births
1680s deaths
Dutch Golden Age painters
Dutch male painters
Dutch marine artists
People from Enkhuizen